The Australian children's music group The Wiggles have produced several television series.  The first one, titled The Wiggles aired in 1998 on Seven Network and consisted of 13 episodes. The second series, also titled The Wiggles, aired in 1999 and consisted of 26 episodes.  The shows were also broadcast overseas, most notably on the Disney Channel during their Playhouse Disney block.

In 2002, The Wiggles began filming three seasons worth of shows exclusively with Australian Broadcasting Corporation (ABC). Lights, Camera, Action, Wiggles (Series 3) aired on ABC 4 Kids in 2002, and The Wiggles Show (Series 4 and Series 5) aired in 2005 and 2006. The network called them "the most successful property that the ABC has represented in the pre-school genre". Paul Field, The Wiggles' general manager, reported that a meeting at a New York City licensing fair with Grahame Grassby, the ABC's acting director of enterprises, led to the ABC's "enthusiastic" agreement to produce The Wiggles' TV shows.  The three seasons, along with the first two series, aired on Disney Channel in the U.S.

When Sam Moran replaced original group member Greg Page in 2006, the series titled Wiggle and Learn (Series 6) aired in Australia in 2008, but no longer aires on Disney Channel.

Following the transition to the new Wiggles members at the beginning of 2013, a new television series was developed titled Ready, Steady, Wiggle! and aired from 2013 to 2015 continuing with Wiggle Town in 2016 Wiggle, Wiggle, Wiggle! in 2017 The Wiggles' World in 2020 and a new season of Ready, Steady, Wiggle! in 2021. In 2022 Wiggly Fruit Salad aired with the Fruit Salad TV members joining in. in 2023 Ready, Steady, Wiggle! returned for a fourth season.

The Wiggles (1998) 
Also shown on the Disney Channel in 2002.

The Wiggles supporting cast
 Paul Paddick as Captain Feathersword
 Leeanne Ashley as Dorothy the Dinosaur
 Charmaine Martin and Elyssa Dawson as Henry the Octopus
 Leanne Halloran as Officer Beaples
 Edward Rooke and Paul Field as Wags the Dog
 Carolyne Ferrie as Dorothy's voice, Lilly, Ms. Fez, host of Kaz the Cat
 Niki Owen as Zardo Zap, Lilly's Assistant, Jeff the Mechanic, sports commentator

The Wiggles  episode titles
 "Anthony's Friend"
 "Foodman"
 "Murray's Shirt"
 "Building Blocks"
 "Jeff the Mechanic"
 "Lilly"
 "Zardo Zap"
 "The Party"
 "Wiggle Opera"
 "Haircut"
 "Muscleman Murray"
 "Spooked Wiggles"
 "Funny Greg"

The Wiggles (1999–2000) 
In 2001–02, in North America, Series 2 was shown before Series 1 on the Disney Channel.

The Wiggles supporting cast
 Leeanne Ashley as Dorothy the Dinosaur
 Leanne Halloran as Officer Beaples
 Reem Hanwell as Henry the Octopus
 Paul Paddick as Captain Feathersword
 Edward Rooke as Wags the Dog

The Wiggles  episode titles

 "Food" 
 "Numbers and Counting" 
 "Dancing" 
 "Dressing Up" 
 "Your Body" 
 "At Play" 
 "Safety" 
 "Storytelling" 
 "Friends" 
 "Multicultural" 
 "Musical Instruments" 
 "Hygiene" 
 "Animals" 
 "History" 
 "Family" 
 "Movement" 
 "Nutrition" 
 "Directions" 
 "Manners" 
 "Travel" 
 "Play" 
 "The Body" 
 "Communication" 
 "Work" 
 "Imagination" 
 "Cows & Ducks"

Lights, Camera, Action, Wiggles! (2002–2003) 
Lights, Camera, Action, Wiggles!, also referred to as The Wiggles TV Series 3,  is the third television series by The Wiggles. The series takes place on a fictional television studio as they produce a show called Network Wiggles, with regular on-camera segments as well as the usual music videos.  This is the first series to use young adults as Band Dancers in addition to kids dancing. The episodes do not have official titles; they were simply numbered (e.g. "Episode 1", "Episode 37") and ran for 11 minutes. The Disney Channel version for overseas combined two episodes.

Lights, Camera, Action, Wiggles! supporting cast
 Paul Paddick as Captain Feathersword
 Corinne O'Rafferty as Dorothy the Dinosaur
 Jacqueline Field as the voice of Dorothy
 Andrew McCourt as Wags the Dog
 Kristy Talbot as Henry the Octopus
 Kase Amer, Sharryn Dermody, Ben Murray, Larissa Wright as band dancers
 Chloe Harrison and Ryan Jago as voiceovers for CSAs

The Wiggles Show! (2005–2006) 
The Wiggles Show!, also referred to as The Wiggles TV Series 4 and The Wiggles TV Series 5,  is the fourth television series by The Wiggles. The series includes Captain Feathersword segments that involve a larger pirate crew.

The Wiggles Show! TV Series 1  episode titles (22-minute version)
Also shown on the Disney Channel 2005–2006.

 "Wiggly Party" 
 "Big Red Car" 
 "Play Your Guitar" 
 "Elbow to Elbow" 
 "Kangaroo Dance" 
 "Learn Languages" 
 "Topsy Turvy" 
 "Where's Jeff?" 
 "Wiggly Mystery" 
 "Caveland" 
 "Wiggle Groove" 
 "Bow Wow Wow" 
 "Make Some Rosy Tea" 
 ""Monkey Dance" 
 "Musical Quiz" 
 "Say Aah" 
 "Train Dance" 
 "Astronaut Dance" 
 "Jack in the Box" 
 "Cowboys and Cowgirls" 
 "Quack Quack" 
 "Helicopter Dance" 
 "Chirpy Chirpy Dance" 
 "Picking Flowers" 
 "Let's Go Swimming" 
 "Cha Cha Cha"

The Wiggles Show! TV Series 2  episode titles (22-minute version)
Also shown on the Disney Channel 2007–2008. Order is presented as listed in iTunes.

 "Fruity Fun"
 "Let's Have a Dance!"
 "The Wiggle Way"
 "Shh! Shh! Shh!"
 "A Wiggly Concert"
 "Playing a Trick on the Captain"
 "The Gorilla Dance"
 "Pirate Radio"
 "Amazing Alpaca"
 "It's Sunny Today"
 "Picnic Without Ants"
 "We Like To Say Hello"
 "Wiggly Shopping List"
 "Pirate Dancing"
 "Nodding Dance!"
 "Musical Bonanza"
 "O'Reilly!"
 "Shingle Back Lizard"
 "Pirate Dancing Shoes"
 "We Can Do So Many Things"
 "Box of Mystery"
 "Look But Don't Touch"
 "Farmer Brown"
 "Watch, Learn, Dance, Sing"
 "Animal Charades"
 "Fun at the Beach"

Wiggle and Learn (2008) 
Wiggle and Learn, also referred to as The Wiggles TV Series 6 (as the two seasons of The Wiggles Show are sometimes counted as two separate series), was the fifth installment of Wiggles television series, It featured Sam Moran as the Yellow Wiggle. It originally aired in April 2008 on the Treehouse channel in Canada. It later aired in Australia on ABC Kids in May 2008, and in the United States in 2008–2009. There were 26 22-minute episodes, although in some formats the series was split into 52 11-minute segments. The choreographers for the series were Leeanne Ashley and Caterina Mete.

Wiggle and Learn episode titles (22-minute version)

 "Move and Groove"
 "Musical Landscape"
 "Wiggle Dance"
 "The King of Swing"
 "Bailar y Cantar"
 "Barnyard Boogie"
 "The Bobby Bounce"
 "The Black Velvet Band"
 "Fun in the Sun"
 "My Fair Lady!"
 "So Early in the Morning"
 "Soy Capitan"
 "Together We Live So Happily"
 "Oh, Captain!
 "The Biggest Smile of All"
 "The Queen of the Land"
 "Get the Rhythm of the Hips
 "Hear the Drumbeat"
 "Teddy Bear Touch the Ground"
 "Meadowsweet and Lady Smocks"
 "Ding, Ding, Dong!"
 "Buzz, Buzz, Buzz"
 "Shall We Dance!
 "Dance This Way"
 "Kittens and Mittens"
 "Surf, Sand and Sun"

Wiggle and Learn episode titles (11-minute version)

 "We Feel Like Dancing"
 "The Shimmie Shake"
 "Let's Get the Rhythm"
 "Over in the Meadow
 "I Spy"
 "Keep Moving!"
 "Who Am I?"
 "Murray Had a Turtle"
 "La Bamba"
 "Oranges and Lemons"
 "Hey Diddle Diddle"
 "This Way and That"
 "Jeff Gets a Letter"
 "This Old Man"
 "A Sailor Went To Sea"
 "Her Eyes Shone Like Diamonds"
 "Beach, Beach Sandy Beach"
 "Old Dan Tucker"
 "London Bridge
 "There Was a Princess"
 "The Banana Boat"
 "Incy Wincy Spider"
 "Fairy Dancing!"
 "Getting Strong"
 "Pussycat, Pussycat"
 "Fun at Wigglehouse"
 "Hello!"
 "The Five Senses"
 "Big, Bigger, Biggest!"
 "See-Saw"
 "Musical Landscape"
 "D is for Dorothy"
 "The Sporting Salsa!"
 "Jack and Jill"
 "Wags House"
 "Two Fine Gentlemen"
 "Teddy Bear, Teddy Bear"
 "Wiggletastic"
 "English Country Garden"
 "Circus"
 "Frere Jacques"
 "The Turkey in the Straw"
 "Twinkle Twinkle"
 "Sam Gets a Letter"
 "I'm A Cowboy"
 "Smell Your Way Through the Day"
 "The Horn Pipe"
 "Miss Polly Had A Dolly"
 "Allo, Allo, Allo"
 "Three Little Kittens"
 "Nick-Nack Paddy-Wack"
 "I Drive the Big Red Car"

Wiggle and Learn supporting cast
 Paul Paddick as Captain Feathersword
 Emily McGlinn as Dorothy the Dinosaur
 Adrian Quinnell, Kristy Talbot, and Ben Murray as Wags the Dog
 Mario Martinez-Diaz and Rebecca Knox as Henry the Octopus

Ready, Steady, Wiggle!  (2013–2015, 2021, 2023) 
Ready, Steady, Wiggle! also referred to as The Wiggles TV Series 7 and The Wiggles TV Series 8 is a television series featuring the new Wiggles lineup of Emma Watkins, Lachlan Gillespie, Simon Pryce, and Anthony Field.  Greg, Murray and Jeff also make occasional guest appearances in some episodes and videos. The series ran for 2 seasons of 52 11-minute episodes each It returned in 2021 with a third season with new character Bok the Hand Puppet and new segments. In 2023 a fourth season was commissioned with new members Tsehay Hawkins, Evie Ferris, Caterina Mete, John Pearce and Lucia Field added in the cast.

Ready, Steady, Wiggle! TV Series 1 episode titles

 "Miss Polly Had a Dolly"
 "Wake Up Lachy!"
 "Lachy Shrunk the Wiggles"
 "The Wiggly Singing Symphony"
 "Taba Naba"
 "Wash Your Hands"
 "Spring Has Come"
 "Simon Goes Quackers"
 "Ooey, Ooey Allergies"
 "A Lot of Camelot" 
 "Tasty Science"
 "Toot Toot!"
 "Invisible Lachy"
 "Yummy Yummy!"
 "Let's Go Driving in the Big Red Car"
 "Excuse Meow!"
 "Let's All Shake!"
 "Beautiful Ballet"
 "Who Am I?"
 "A Hair Disaster" 
 "Pirate Poetry"
 "The Mango Walk"
 "Emma's Missing Bow"
 "We Like Fruit"
 "Is That Lachy?"
 "Hula Hoop Symphony"
 "Clean Your Teeth!"
 "Percussion Party"
 "Marty Party"
 "Is That Captain Feathersword?" 
 "Is That Wags?"
 "Harry Hula"
 "Musical Memory"
 "Doctor Entertainment"
 "Singing With Lachy"
 "Quack, Quack!"
 "Slow Motion Anthony"
 "Lounge Room Symphony"
 "Wiggly Yoga"
 "A Musical Cake" 
 "The Glass is Half Full"
 "Simon Says"
 "Sign the ABC"
 "Joannie Works With One Hammer"
 "Doctor Anglais"
 "Is That Simon?"
 "Professor Simon's Musical Challenge"
 "Captain's Experiment"
 "Doctor Treble Clef"
 "Captain and the Tomatoes" 
 "What's That Sound?"
 "A Juicy Story"

Ready, Steady, Wiggle! TV Series 2 episode titles

 "Captain's Lost Hornpipe"
 "Emma's Ballet"
 "Apples and Bananas"
 "Emma's Bike Won't Work"
 "Dressing Up In Style"
 "Lachy Can't Rhyme"
 "Simon's Brush With Fame"
 "Big Red Boat"
 "Anthony Forgets"
 "The Hawk" 
 "Simon Can't Stop Yodelling!"
 "Cowboy Anthony"
 "Simon's Sad Fruit Salad"
 "The Talking Cow"
 "Beaky Can't Sing!"
 "Little Sir Echo"
 "Ahoy There, Lachy!"
 "Emma Can't Read"
 "This Little Piggy"
 "Beep Beep Buckle Up!" 
 "Anthony's Singing"
 "King Simon"
 "Wiggle Talk"
 "Wiggle Picnic"
 "Beaky Overeats"
 "Zamel the Camel"
 "Wags Has Lost His Wiggle"
 "Miss Lucy Had a Ducky"
 "A Mariachi Moment"
 "Riding in the Big Red Car" 
 "The Laughing Doctor"
 "Irish Dancing"
 "Emma, the Firefighter"
 "Lachy's Orange Hair"
 "Romp Bomp A Stomp"
 "What's Your Favourite Nursery Rhyme?"
 "Detective Lachy"
 "Emma's Bad Hair Day"
 "Lachy Can't Sing"
 "Say The Dance, Do The Dance" 
 "Emma's Missing Bow"
 "Captain's Magic Buttons"
 "Simon, The Opera Singer"
 "Dorothy's Baking"
 "Lachy's Bunny Caller"
 "Food, Trains And Animals"
 "Princess Emma Of Wiggle House"
 "Anthony Has Over Eaten!"
 "Hip Hop With Emma"
 "Lachy's Bird Poem" 
 "I'll Tell Me Ma"
 "Lachy's Pappadum Party"

Ready, Steady, Wiggle! TV series 3 episode titles

 "The Transportation Parade"
 "Exercising with our Friends"
 "Teamwork in Wiggle Town"
 "I Can See You, You Can See Me"
 "Wash Your Hands"
 "Brr Its Cold Outside"
 "We're All Fruit Salad"
 "Captain's Birthday Party"
 "The Instruments We Love To Play"
 "How Are You Feeling Today?"
 "Emma's Missing Glasses"
 "Rainbow of Colours"
 "The Foods We Love To Eat" 

===Ready, Steady, Wiggle! TV Series 4 episode titles

Wiggle Town! (2016) 
Wiggle Town! also referred to as The Wiggles TV series 9 is a short Television series based on the video of the same name. It's the second series to feature the new Wiggles lineup. the series contains 52 5-minute episodes each.

Wiggle Town! episode titles

 "The Wonder of Wiggle Town"
 "Twinkle Twinkle"
 "Ballet Time"
 "Teddy Bear, Teddy Bear, Turn Around"
 "Emma's Riding Boots"
 "Wiggly Concert"
 "Wiggle Express"
 "Wiggletto"
 "Do The Pretzel"
 "Come On Down to Wiggle Town"
 "Let's Irish Dance"
 "Wags Loves to Tango"
 "Little Dingo"
 "Dance Dance!"
 "Irish Stew"
 "Romp Bomp A Stomp"
 "Henry Likes Water"
 "Opera Singing"
 "Officer Beaples"
 "I Went to the Library"
 "Toot Toot, Chugga Chugga"
 "Fruit Salad"
 "Rock-A-Bye Your Bear"
 "Hot Potato"
 "The Sidewalks of New York"
 "Here Comes a Bear"
 "D-I-N-G-O"
 "Dogs, Cats. Bunnies and Fish"
 "Emma's Yellow Bow"
 "Wiggly Arena"
 "Joannie"
 "Little Sir Echo"
 "Buzz, Buzz!"
 "Rock & Roll Preschool"
 "Lavenders Blue"
 "Tap Dancing Time"
 "Say the Dance, Do the Dance"
 "It's a Beautiful Day"
 "Simon Says"
 "Yummy Yummy"
 "Apples & Bananas"
 "Wiggle Town Dancing Police"
 "Laugh, Draw, Sing Anything"
 "The Little Boat"
 "Broccoli Bunch"
 "Police Plies"
 "Wobbly Camel"
 "I'm Going To Ride My Bike Today"
 "Piano Party"
 "Do the Propeller"
 "It's Okay to Cry"
 "Springtime

Wiggle, Wiggle Wiggle! (2017)  
Wiggle, Wiggle, Wiggle! also referred to as The Wiggles TV Series 10 is a Television series starring the new Wiggles lineup being their third one after Ready, Steady, Wiggle! and Wiggle Town. this series contains 26 22-minute episodes each.

Wiggle, Wiggle, Wiggle! episode titles

 "Hello Everyone"
 "Bow Mobile to the Rescue"
 "Wiggly Radio"
 "No Fleas Please"
 "The Wiggly Races"
 "The Singing Barbers"
 "A Wiggly Wedding"
 "Dancing Is So Nice Fun"
 "Numerals Are Nice"
 "Yummy in My Tummy"
 "Waltzing Matilda"
 "Rock & Roll Preschool"
 "Hot Potato"
 "The Wiggly Opera"
 "Clap Your Hands"
 "Feather Fun!"
 "Fly Through The Sky"
 "Pigtail Polka"
 "Soccer Fun"
 "Dance with Emma"
 "Enthusiasm"
 "Simon Says"
 "Henry Saves the Day"
 "Dorothy's Tea Party"
 "The Wiggly Plane"
 "Do The Twist!"

The Wiggles' World (2020)  
The Wiggles' World also referred to as The Wiggles TV Series 11 is a Television series starring the new Wiggles lineup it's their fourth one after Wiggle, Wiggle, Wiggle. this series contains 26 11-minute episodes each.

The Wiggles' World episode titles

 "Five-Fingered Family"
 "Avo, Avo, Avocado"
 "We Got Our Glasses On"
 "Cowboy Fun"
 "Shirley Shawn the Unicorn"
 "We're All Friends"
 "Stinky Cheese Day!"
 "Lachy's Curly World"
 "World Record Dancing"
 "A King Who Liked to Sing!"
 "Surfer Bop"
 "Emma's Weather Bag"
 "Sticky Rice Cake Surprise"
 "Broccoli Bunch"
 "A Puppet Show"
 "Funny Face"
 "Put the Pop In The Popcorn"
 "Double Talk With Captain"
 "Hot Dog!"
 "Cream Pie Fun"
 "It's Sunny Today"
 "The Curly Bird"
 "Dance Spectacular!"
 "Sensational Salsa"
 "Little, Little, Little Lord Fauntleroy"
 "Dorothy's Rosy Tea-Time"

Wiggly Fruit Salad (2022)  
Wiggly Fruit Salad also referred to as The Wiggles TV Series 13 is a short Television series starring the new Wiggles lineup after Emma left the band. Tsehay has her first appearance alongside Fruit Salad TV's John, Evie and Kelly. this series contains 10 5 and a 1/2-minute episodes.

Wiggly Fruit Salad episode titles

 Sing Together
 Wiggly Friendship
 Big Strong John
 Is There Anything Bok Can't Do
 Thank You Lollipop Person
 Paloma, The Modern Mermaid
 Let's Do the Choppy Corker
 Tsehay's Sunflower Power
 Wave To The Garbage Truck
 Food Makes You Big And Strong

Home media

See also
 Dorothy the Dinosaur
 The Wiggles videography

References

External links
 
  Ready Steady Wiggle website (series 7) on ABC

Lists of children's television series episodes
Episodes